Ormsby Place is a residential neighbourhood in west Edmonton, Alberta, Canada.  It is named for the person who developed Edmonton's grid system of streets.

Demographics 

Residential development 
Residential development of the neighbourhood, according to the 2001 federal census, commenced during the 1970s when just under one half (46.4%) of the residences were constructed.  Another three in ten (28.7) were constructed during the 1980s.  Most of the remaining residences were constructed during the 1990s.

According to the 2005 municipal census, the most common type of residence, accounting for just over half (55%) of all residences, was the Single-family dwelling.  Another one in three (34%) were row houses.  Apartments account for another 8%, while duplexes account for the remaining 4%.  Three out of four (76%) of residences are owner occupied while only one residence in four (24%) are rented.

There is a single school in the neighbourhood, Ormsby Elementary School, operated by the Edmonton Public School System.

West Edmonton Mall is located a short distance to the north along 178 Street.

The neighbourhood is bounded on the west by Anthony Henday Drive, on the south by Callingwood Road, on the east by 178 Street, and on the north by 69 Avenue.  The Anthony Henday provides access to destinations to the south of the city including the Edmonton International Airport.

Surrounding neighbourhoods

References

External links 
 Ormsby Place Neighbourhood Profile

Neighbourhoods in Edmonton